= Intrinsic pathway =

In molecular biology, the term intrinsic pathway may refer to multiple cascades of protein interactions:

- The intrinsic pathway of apoptosis (also known as the mitochondrial pathway, intracellular pathway, or intrinsic apoptosis), cell death initiated by changes in mitochondria.
- The intrinsic pathway of blood coagulation (also known as the contact activation pathway), a cascade of enzymatic reactions resulting in blood clotting.
